The Spirit International Amateur Golf Championship is a biennial amateur golf tournament which takes place in alternating years with the World Amateur Team Championships. The competition consists 20 countries represented by teams of four (two men and two women) and takes place at the Whispering Pines Golf Club, located 80 miles outside of Houston in Trinity, Texas.

Added in 2013, the winner of the individual men's competition receives a sponsor exemption to the PGA Tour’s Crowne Plaza Invitational at Colonial.

Format
Teammates compete in a 72-hole best ball competition in which medals are awarded to the top three places in each of the five following categories; International Team (combined men's and women's teams), men's team, women's team, men's individual, and women's individual. The winners of the men's and women's individual competitions are determined by the player with the most birdies and eagles.

Team selection
The majority of the participating countries are invited based on the previous year's World Amateur Team Championship combined results. Each nation then establishes its own selection criteria to determine the best individual participants available. In 2009, the field consisted of 76 National Champions. Notable past champions who have gone on to become established professionals include; Brandt Snedeker, Martin Kaymer, Jordan Spieth, Paula Creamer, and Lorena Ochoa.

Results
Source:

USA has won 6 matches, England 2, and France and Mexico 1 each.

References

External links
Official site - most of the information is in the archive sections

Team golf tournaments
Amateur golf tournaments in the United States